Adelaida Pchelintseva (born 29 September 1999) is a Kazakhstani swimmer. She competed in the women's 50 metre breaststroke at the 2019 World Aquatics Championships held in Gwangju, South Korea and she did not advance to compete in the semi-finals.

References

External links
 

1999 births
Living people
Kazakhstani female breaststroke swimmers
Place of birth missing (living people)
21st-century Kazakhstani women